Asahel is a given name. Notable people with the given name include:

Asahel C. Beckwith (1827–1896), American politician
Asahel Bush (1824–1913), American newspaper publisher and businessman 
Asahel Curtis (1874–1941), American photographer
Asahel Farr, American politician
Asahel Finch Jr. (1809–1883), American politician and lawyer
Asahel Grant (1807–1844), American missionary
Asahel Gridley (1810–1881), American politician, lawyer, merchant and banker
Asahel Henderson (1815-?), American politician
Asahel W. Hubbard (1819–1879), American judge and politician
Asahel Huntington (1798–1870), American politician 
Asahel C. Kendrick (1809-1895), American classicist, grammarian and exegete
Asahel Lathrop (1810–1893), American Mormon pioneer
Asahel Hooker Lewis (1810-1862), American newspaper editor and politician
Asahel Nettleton (1783–1844), American theologian and evangelist
A. H. Patch (1825–1909), American inventor and manufacturer
Asahel Perry (1784–1869), American politician and community leader
Asahel Lynde Powers (1813-1843), American painter
Asahel Stearns (1774–1839), American politician
Asahel Thomson (1790–1866), American physician and politician